The 1997 Western Athletic Conference Mustangs football team represented Southern Methodist University (SMU) as a member of the Mountain Division of the Western Athletic Conference (WAC) during 1997 NCAA Division I-A football season. Led by first-year head coach Mike Cavan, the Mustangs compiled an overall record of 6–5 with a mark of 5–3 in conference play, tying for second place in the WAC's Mountain Division. Ten years after the NCAA's 1987 "death penalty" on SMU football, SMU's 1997 campaign was the program's first winning season since the football program resumed operations in 1989. The Mustangs played their home games at the Cotton Bowl in Dallas.

Schedule

Roster

Personnel
Mike Cavan succeeded Tom Rossley as SMU head coach. Rossley coached SMU from 1991 to 1996 and left with a 15–48–3 record. Cavan became SMU's third head coach in the post-"death penalty" era for SMU. Cavan was previously head coach at Valdosta State from 1986 to 1991 and East Tennessee State from 1992 to 1996. This is Cavan's first head coaching job at a Division I-A school.

After the season

Coaching changes
Offensive coordinator Darrell Dickey left SMU to take the head coaching job at North Texas in 1998; Greg Briner, previously the quarterbacks and wide receivers coach at Georgia, succeeded Dickey as offensive coordinator. Offensive line graduate assistant Paul Etheridge was promoted to tight ends and offensive tackles David McKnight moved to running backs coach.

NFL Draft

In the 1998 NFL Draft, linebacker Chris Bordano was selected by the New Orleans Saints in the sixth round and 161st overall.

References

External links
 1997 SMU stats at Sports-Reference.com

SMU
SMU Mustangs football seasons
SMU Mustangs football